Wayne Victor Rostad, CM (born 28 October 1947 in Ottawa, Ontario) is a Canadian musician and television presenter.

Career
In 1969, he became a radio host for CJET in Smiths Falls. After this, he worked at CKWS-TV in Kingston, CKBY radio in Ottawa, and CJCN radio in Grand Falls, Newfoundland.
He moved from broadcasting to music in the 1970s, earning a Juno Award nomination in 1981 and recording several albums to date.
Rostad returned to broadcasting in the 1980s, leading to his most prominent work as host of CBC Television's On the Road Again. During the program's run from 1987 to 2007, he interviewed ordinary people throughout Canada.
Rostad also participates in various charitable events such as telethons for the Children's Hospital of Eastern Ontario and the University of Ottawa Heart Institute, among others.
He founded the Gatineau Clog Music Festival which took place at Tucker Lake in Low, Quebec.
Rostad also served as a Canadian Forces Honorary Colonel for the 8 Air Maintenance Squadron.

Personal life
Rostad currently lives in Ottawa, Ontario. He has one son, Josh, from a previous marriage.

Awards and recognition
 1981: nominee, Juno Award for Country Male Vocalist of the Year
 1988: nominee, Gemini Award for Best Performance by a Host, Interviewer or Anchor (Out Our Way)
 1990: nominee, Gemini Award for Best Performance by a Host, Interviewer or Anchor (On the Road Again)
 1992: nominee, Gemini Award for Best Host in a Light Information, Variety or Performing Arts Program or Series (On the Road Again)
 1994: nominee, Gemini Award for Best Host in a Lifestyle Information, Variety or Performing Arts Program or Series (On the Road Again)
 1995: nominee, Gemini Award for Best Host in a Lifestyle Information, Variety or Performing Arts Program or Series (On the Road Again)
 1996: nominee, Gemini Award for Best Host in a Lifestyle Information, Variety or Performing Arts Program or Series (On the Road Again)
 1999: nominee, Gemini Award for Best Host in a Lifestyle or Performing Arts Program or Series (On the Road Again)
 2000: nominee, Gemini Award for Best Host in a Lifestyle or Performing Arts Program or Series (On the Road Again)
 2002: Inducted into the Ottawa Valley Country Music Hall of Fame
 2003: appointed Member of the Order of Canada
 2010: inducted into the Canadian Country Music Hall of Fame

Discography

Albums

Singles

References

External links
 CBC Television: Wayne Rostad profile 2, accessed 19 February 2007
Wayne Rostad on MySpace, accessed 19 February 2007

Living people
1947 births
Canadian country singer-songwriters
Canadian male singer-songwriters
Canadian television hosts
Members of the Order of Canada
Musicians from Ottawa